Jasmine Burke is an American actress. She is starring as Dr. Christie Johnson in the Bounce TV prime time soap opera, Saints & Sinners.

Early life and career 
Burke was born and raised in Atlanta, Georgia, and studied theatre and business at Kennesaw State University. She began her acting career appearing in small parts in films Daddy's Little Girls (2007), The Secret Life of Bees (2008), and Mississippi Damned (2009). On television, she has appeared in Making The Band 3,The Vampire Diaries, Drop Dead Diva, and Army Wives, and well as VH1 film Drumline: A New Beat. She played the leading role in the 2015 independent drama film Skinned directed by LisaRaye McCoy.

In 2016, Burke was cast alongside Vanessa Bell Calloway, Gloria Reuben and Clifton Powell in the Bounce TV prime time soap opera, Saints & Sinners.

Filmography

Film

Television

References

External links
 

African-American actresses
Living people
Actresses from Atlanta
Kennesaw State University alumni
American television actresses
American film actresses
21st-century American actresses
21st-century African-American women
21st-century African-American people
20th-century African-American people
20th-century African-American women
Year of birth missing (living people)